Frederick N. Young (January 1, 1932 – January 12, 2006) was a member of the Ohio House of Representatives serving from 1969 to 1976. Young graduated from Harvard Law School and practiced law in his father's law firm. From 1993 to 2005, he served on the Ohio District Courts of Appeals

References

Politicians from Dayton, Ohio
Harvard Law School alumni
Judges of the Ohio District Courts of Appeals
Republican Party members of the Ohio House of Representatives
1932 births
2006 deaths
20th-century American judges
20th-century American politicians